A factory ship, also known as a fish processing vessel, is a large ocean-going vessel with extensive on-board facilities for processing and freezing caught fish or whales. Modern factory ships are automated and enlarged versions of the earlier whalers and their use for fishing has grown dramatically. Some factory ships are equipped to serve as a mother ship.

Background

Contemporary factory ships have their origins in the early whalers. These vessels sailed into remote waters and processed the whale oil on board, discarding the carcass. Later whalers converted the entire whale into usable products. The efficiency of these ships and the predation they carried out on whales contributed greatly to the animals' steep decline.

Contemporary factory ships are automated and enlarged versions of these earlier whalers. Their use for fishing has grown dramatically. For a while, Russia, Japan and Korea operated huge fishing fleets centred on factory ships, though in recent times this use has been declining. On the other hand, the use of factory ships by the United States has increased.

Some factory ships can also function as mother ships. The basic idea of a mother ship is that it can carry small fishing boats that return to the mother ship with their catch. But the idea extends to include factory trawlers supporting a fleet of smaller catching vessels that are not carried on board. They serve as the main ship in a fleet operating in waters a great distance from their home ports.

Types
Fish processing ships consist of various types, including freezer trawlers, longline factory vessels, purse seine freezer vessels, stern trawlers and squid jiggers.

Factory stern trawler

A factory stern trawler is a large stern trawler which has additional onboard processing facilities and can stay at sea for days or weeks at a time. A stern trawler tows a fishing trawl net and hauls the catch up a stern ramp. These can be either demersal (weighted bottom trawling); pelagic (mid-water trawling); or pair trawling, where two vessels about 500 metres apart together pull one huge net with a mouth circumference of 900 meters.

Freezer trawler
A freezer trawler fully processes the catch on board to customers’ specifications, into frozen-at-sea fillet, block or head and gutted form.  Factory freezer trawlers can run to 60 to 70 meters in length and go to sea for six weeks at a time with a crew of over 35 people. They process fish into fillets within hours of being caught.  Onboard fishmeal plants process the waste product so everything is utilized.

The world's largest freezing trawler by gross tonnage is the 144-metre-long Annelies Ilena ex Atlantic Dawn.  In 2015, the Annelies Ilena was detained by the Irish Navy and the Sea Fisheries Protection Agency for breach of regulations.  The owners were subsequently fined 105,000 Euros for illegally fishing in Irish waters.  She is able to process 350 tonnes of fish a day, can carry 3,000 tons of fuel, and store 7,000 tons of graded and frozen catch. She uses on board forklift trucks to aid discharging.

Factory bottom longliner

These automated bottom longliners fish using hooks strung on long lines. The hooks are baited automatically and the lines are released very fast. Many thousands of hooks are set each day, the retrieval and setting of these hooks is a continuous 24-hour-a-day operation. These ships go to sea for six weeks at a time. They contain factories for processing fish into fillets, which are frozen in packs, ready for market, within hours of being caught. These vessels sometimes also have fishmeal plants on board.

Purse seiner

A purse seiner is a fishing vessel which uses a traditional method of catching tuna and other school fish species. A large net is set in a circle around a school of fish while on the surface.  The net is then pursed, closing the bottom of the net, then pulling up the net until the fish are caught alongside the vessel.  Most of these types of vessels then transfer the fish into a tank filled with brine (extra salty refrigerated water). This freezes large amounts of fish quickly.  Trip lengths can vary from 20 to 70 days depending on the fishing.  The fish is held in refrigerated brine tanks and unloads either directly to the canneries or is trans-shipped to carrier vessels to freight to the canneries, leaving the purse seine vessel close to the fishing grounds to continue fishing. Purse seiners longer than 70 metres are called super seiners.

Factory squid jigger

A factory squid jigger is a specialized ship that uses powerful lights to attract squid and then "jigs" many thousands of hooked lures from hundreds of separate winches. These predominantly Japanese and Korean factory vessels and their crews may fish the oceans continuously for two years, periodically transferring their catch at the fishing grounds to larger refrigerated vessels.

Factory barges
Some fish processing factories are installed on barges, making a floating factory which can be towed across navigable waters to receive catches from commercial fishing vessels. The barges often contain living quarters for the factory workers.

Whaler factory

The 8,145-ton MV Nisshin Maru is the mothership of the Japanese whaling fleet and is the world's only remaining whaler factory ship. The ship is owned by Tokyo-based company Kyodo Senpaku Kaisha Ltd. and is contracted by the Japanese Institute of Cetacean Research.

Overfishing

Commercial fish processing ships can affect birds, whales, dolphins, turtles and sharks by their broad reach methods of catching fish.

Purse seine ships, with nets up to two kilometres in circumference, can encircle whole shoals of pelagic fish, such as mackerel, herring and tuna.

A major international scientific study released in November 2006 in the journal Science found that about one-third of all fishing stocks worldwide have collapsed (with a collapse being defined as a decline to less than 10% of their maximum observed abundance), and that if current trends continue all fish stocks worldwide will collapse within fifty years.

The FAO State of World Fisheries and Aquaculture 2004 report estimates that in 2003, of the main fish stocks or groups of resources for which assessment information is available, "approximately one-quarter were overexploited, depleted or recovering from depletion (16%, 7% and 1% respectively) and needed rebuilding.

The threat of overfishing is not limited to the target species only. As trawlers resort to deeper and deeper waters to fill their nets, they have begun to threaten delicate deep-sea ecosystems and the fish that inhabit them, such as the coelacanth. In the May 15, 2003 issue of the journal Nature, it is estimated that 10% of large predatory fish remain compared to levels before commercial fishing. Many fisheries experts, however, consider this claim to be
exaggerated with respect to tuna populations.

From 1950 (18 million tons) to 1969 (56 million tons) fishfood production grew by about 5% each year; from 1969 onward production has raised 8% annually. It is expected that this demand will continue to rise, and MariCulture Systems estimated in 2002 that, by 2010, seafood production would have to increase by over 15.5 million tonnes to meet the desire of Earth's growing population. This is likely to further aggravate the problem of overfishing, unless aquaculture technology expands to meet the needs of human population.

The world's total wild catch has remained constant for almost 30 years.

Overfishing has depleted some fish populations to the point that large scale commercial fishing, on average around the world, is not economically viable without government assistance. Many states offer subsidies to their fishing fleets, which is unsustainable in the long term. According to Oceana, the global fishing fleet is currently up to 250 percent larger than it needs to be to catch what the oceans can sustainably produce.

See also
 Fish factory
 Research vessel

References

External links
  Capture Fishing Industry
  Commercial Fishing and Seafood Distribution
  Factory Fishing Overfishing (BBC)
 The World's Largest Tuna Fishing Vessel - YouTube

Fish processing
Ship types